Group D of the 2018 FIBA Women's Basketball World Cup took place from 22 to 25 September 2018. The group consisted of China, Latvia, Senegal and the United States.

The top team advanced to the quarterfinals while the second and third placed team played in a qualification round.

Teams

Standings

Matches

Latvia vs China

United States vs Senegal

Senegal vs Latvia

China vs United States

Senegal vs China

Latvia vs United States

References

2018 FIBA Women's Basketball World Cup